Michael Sprott (born 16 January 1975) is a British former professional boxer. He held the British and Commonwealth heavyweight titles in 2004 and the EBU European Union heavyweight title twice between 2005 and 2007. He was the winner of the 14th Prizefighter series.

Career
After a quiet amateur career, Sprott turned pro in November 1996 under the old Frank Bruno trainer, Terry Lawless. He won 11 fights, including a points win over veteran Michael Murray before taking on Harry Senior in September 1998 for the Southern Area Heavyweight title. Senior, a respected sparring partner, had recently dedicated himself to being a full-time professional, and took Sprott out in 6 rounds with body shots. Sprott came back with 3 wins before falling apart in 3 rounds versus British contender Wayne Llewelyn in October 2000.

Seemingly relegated to journeyman status, In February 2001 in London, Sprott scored an upset when he outpointed the once-beaten German Timo Hoffmann, who had lost only to Vitali Klitschko. He travelled to Germany for the rematch, controversially outpointed by Hoffmann in a result that was jeered loudly by the German crowd.

In November 2001, he travelled to South Africa to face hard hitting fringe contender Corrie Sanders. In a brief and entertaining fight, Sprott rocked the southpaw before being decked himself, and suffering a controversial stoppage by the referee, with even the South African commentators deploring the stoppage.

In February 2002, Keith Long pulled out from a British and Commonwealth title fight with Danny Williams, and Sprott flew in from a holiday in Jamaica on only a few days notice. After a few rounds he ran out of gas and was stopped in the seventh round, but showed he could compete at national level. It was around this time that Sprott brought in trainer John Bloomfield, who spent six years with Frank Bruno.

After this challenge, Sprott went on a successful run of form, winning 8 fights, including knockouts of Pele Reid (KO7), ex-British champ Michael Holden (KO4), Mark Potter (KO3), and Colin Kenna (KO1), setting up a rematch with Williams.

In September 2003, Sprott qualified for another shot at Williams and his titles, but after a far more competitive fight, Sprott was the victim of several low blows. When he complained to the referee he was controversially knocked out by a Williams left hook.

In January 2004, Sprott narrowly outpointed Williams in their third and final fight (115-114), lifting the British and Commonwealth titles. A few months later Williams would knockout Mike Tyson, however Sprott would lose his titles in his first defense, matched with fast undefeated Matt Skelton (12-0), Sprott was mauled and stopped in the 12th. His last fight of 2004 was a win against Czech heavyweight champ Robert Šulgan in Bethnal Green.

In 2005, Sprott would take the first of many trips abroad fighting top prospects, usually at short notice. In April he beat the German amateur star Cengiz Koc, but in October was beaten on points by Olympian Paolo Vidoz in a European title fight, both fights in Germany. In December he fought future European champ Vladimir Virchis in Austria, but was once-again the victim of a controversial decision loss.

In February 2006, he outboxed veteran Antoine Palatis in Scotland, but in a WBA Eliminator in July was hammered in 8 one-sided rounds by undefeated Ruslan Chagaev. Despite the loss he went back to Germany and beat a third German prospect when he upset undefeated southpaw Rene Dettweiller in November.

During his travels in Germany, Sprott had picked up the second-tier European Heavyweight title, the "EU" title, which he defended against 2000 Olympic Gold medallist Audley Harrison in London, February 2007. Harrison had demolished Danny Williams in his last fight and was on course to face Matt Skelton in a world title eliminator. A 9/2 underdog with most bookies, Sprott came off the floor in the 1st round to score a rare stoppage win by knocking Harrison clean out in the 3rd with a left hook; and seemingly ending his career.

On 14 July 2007, Sprott lost to Matt Skelton in a 12-round contest. The fight was of a very poor standard with Skelton winning on points.

On 31 May 2008, Sprott travelled to Germany to face hot prospect, and the WBA's #4 ranked contender Taras Bidenko. Sprott was outpointed in a 10-round unanimous decision, with 2 judges scoring the bout 97–93, and the other seeing it 97–94.

On 14 March 2009, Sprott fought former WBO heavyweight champion Lamon Brewster and lost a unanimous decision.

He fought Alexander Ustinov on 20 June 2009, but lost by unanimous decision after ten rounds. However he beat German Werner Kreiskott by round 1 TKO in March 2010 and this earned him a shot at the vacant European Boxing Union title against old foe Audley Harrison at Alexandra Palace in April 2010. Sprott was leading the bout on all three scorecards before Harrison knocked out Sprott with seconds remaining of round 12.

On 9 October 2010, a 35-year-old Sprott competed in Sky's 'PrizeFighter' series (Heavyweights), reaching the final where he fought Matt Skelton. It was third time lucky for Sprott, who had lost his previous 2 contests with the 43-year-old Skelton, Winning on a split decision (29-28 Skelton 29-28 sprott 29-28 sprott) after the 3 round contest and winning £32,000 in 'winner take all' prize money.  In September 2011, he suffered a third defeat in a European heavyweight title bout when he lost a unanimous points decision to Ukrainian Alexander Dimitrenko in Hamburg.

Outside the ring
Michael Sprott has a son called Darnell born around 2001. Darnell's name is stitched on the shorts Sprott wears for his professional contests. In recent contests Sprott's shorts have also displayed the name of his late sister Ginette, who took her own life in September 2009 after a long battle with depression.

He lists his hobbies as weights, travelling and meeting new people. Outside boxing, Sprott enjoys rugby and the Wimbledon Championships. His favourite football teams are Reading FC and Arsenal F.C.

Professional boxing record

|-
| style="text-align:center;" colspan="8"|42 Wins (17 knockouts), 29 Losses (18 knockouts), 0 Draws
|-  style="text-align:center; background:#e3e3e3;"
|  style="border-style:none none solid solid; "|Res.
|  style="border-style:none none solid solid; "|Record
|  style="border-style:none none solid solid; "|Opponent
|  style="border-style:none none solid solid; "|Type
|  style="border-style:none none solid solid; "|Round
|  style="border-style:none none solid solid; "|Date
|  style="border-style:none none solid solid; "|Location
|  style="border-style:none none solid solid; "|Notes
|- align=center
|Loss
|42-29
|align=left| Lukasz Rozanski	
|TKO
|2 
|2018-06-02
|align=left|
|align=left|
|- align=center
|Loss
|42-28
|align=left| Ali Eren Demirezen
|TKO
|5 
|2017-12-23
|align=left|
|align=left|
|- align=center
|Loss
|42-27
|align=left| Marcin Siwy	
|UD
|6
|2016-11-05
|align=left|
|align=left|
|- align=center
|Loss
|42-26
|align=left| Christian Hammer	
|KO
|1 
|2016-03-18
|align=left|
|align=left|
|- align=center
|Loss
|42-25
|align=left| Adrian Granat	
|KO
|1 
|2015-12-05
|align=left|
|align=left|
|- align=center
|Loss
|42-24
|align=left| Carlos Takam	
|KO
|5 
|2015-06-13
|align=left|
|align=left|
|- align=center
|Loss
|42-23
|align=left| Anthony Joshua
|TKO
|1 
|2014-11-22
|align=left| 
|align=left|
|- align=center
|Loss
|42-22
|align=left| Kali Meehan
|KO
|1
|2014-06-04
|align=left| 
|align=left|
|- align=center
|Win
|42-21
|align=left| Anthony Nansen
|UD
|3
|2014-06-04
|align=left| 
|align=left|
|- align=center
|Win
|41-21
|align=left| Martin Rogan
|MD
|3
|2014-06-04
|align=left| 
|align=left|
|- align=center
|Win
|40-21
|align=left| Jason Gavern
|UD
|3
|2013-11-14
|align=left| 
|align=left|
|- align=center
|Win
|39-21
|align=left| Brian Minto
|UD
|3
|2013-11-14
|align=left| 
|align=left|
|- align=center
|Win
|38-21
|align=left| Damian Wills
|UD
|3
|2013-11-14
|align=left| 
|align=left|
|- align=center
|Loss
|37-21
|align=left| Erkan Teper
|TKO
|1 
|2013-08-31
|align=left| 
|align=left|
|- align=center
|Loss
|37-20
|align=left| Robert Helenius
|UD
|10
|2013-03-23
|align=left| 
|align=left|
|- align=center
|Win
|37-19
|align=left| Edmund Gerber
|MD
|12
|2012-12-15
|align=left| 
|align=left|
|- align=center
|Loss
|36-19
|align=left| Edmund Gerber
|TKO
|4 
|2012-09-15
|align=left| 
|align=left|
|- align=center
|Loss
|36-18
|align=left| Kubrat Pulev
|RTD
|9 
|2012-01-14
|align=left| 
|align=left|
|- align=center
|Loss
|36-17
|align=left| Alexander Dimitrenko
|UD
|12
|2011-09-24
|align=left| 
|align=left|
|- align=center
|Loss
|36-16
|align=left| Tye Fields
|SD
|3
|2011-05-27
|align=left| 
|align=left|
|- align=center
|Win
|36-15
|align=left| Serdar Uysal
|UD
|4
|2011-03-19
|align=left| 
|align=left|
|- align=center
|Win
|35-15
|align=left| Matt Skelton
|SD
|3
|2010-10-09
|align=left| 
|align=left|
|- align=center
|Win
|34-15
|align=left| Shane McPhilbin
|UD
|3
|2010-10-09
|align=left| 
|align=left|
|- align=center
|Win
|33-15
|align=left| Danny Hughes
|UD
|3
|2010-10-09
|align=left| 
|align=left|
|- align=center
|Loss
|32-15
|align=left| Audley Harrison
|KO
|12 
|2010-04-09
|align=left| 
|align=left|
|- align=center
|Win
|32-14
|align=left| Werner Kreiskott
|TKO
|1 
|2010-03-20
|align=left| 
|align=left|
|- align=center
|Loss
|31-14
|align=left| Alexander Ustinov
|UD
|10
|2009-06-20
|align=left| 
|align=left|
|- align=center
|Loss
|31-13
|align=left| Lamon Brewster
|UD
|8
|2009-03-14
|align=left| 
|align=left|
|- align=center
|Win
|31-12
|align=left| Zack Page
|PTS
|6
|2008-11-19
|align=left| 
|align=left|
|- align=center
|Loss
|30-12
|align=left| Taras Bydenko
|UD
|10
|2008-05-31
|align=left| 
|align=left|
|- align=center
|Loss
|30-11
|align=left| Matt Skelton
|MD
|12
|2007-07-14
|align=left| 
|align=left|
|- align=center
|Win
|30-10
|align=left| Audley Harrison
|KO
|3 
|2007-02-17
|align=left| 
|align=left|
|- align=center
|Win
|29-10
|align=left| Rene Dettweiler
|SD
|12
|2006-11-04
|align=left| 
|align=left|
|- align=center
|Loss
|28-10
|align=left| Ruslan Chagaev
|TKO
|8 
|2006-07-15
|align=left| 
|align=left|
|- align=center
|Win
|28-9
|align=left| Antoine Palatis
|UD
|10
|2006-02-18
|align=left| 
|align=left|
|- align=center
|Loss
|27-9
|align=left| Volodymyr Vyrchys
|UD
|12
|2005-12-13
|align=left| 
|align=left|
|- align=center
|Loss
|27-8
|align=left| Paolo Vidoz
|UD
|12
|2005-10-01
|align=left| 
|align=left|
|- align=center
|Win
|27-7
|align=left| Cengiz Koc
|SD
|10
|2005-04-23
|align=left| 
|align=left|
|- align=center
|Win
|26-7
|align=left| Robert Sulgan
|TKO
|1 
|2004-09-10
|align=left| 
|align=left|
|- align=center
|Loss
|25-7
|align=left| Matt Skelton
|KO
|12 
|2004-04-24
|align=left| 
|align=left|
|- align=center
|Win
|25-6
|align=left| Danny Williams
|PTS
|12
|2004-01-24
|align=left| 
|align=left|
|- align=center
|Loss
|24-6
|align=left| Danny Williams
|TKO
|5 
|2003-09-26
|align=left| 
|align=left|
|- align=center
|Win
|24-5
|align=left| Colin Kenna
|TKO
|1 
|2003-08-01
|align=left| 
|align=left|
|- align=center
|Win
|23-5
|align=left| Petr Horacek
|KO
|1 
|2003-06-10
|align=left| 
|align=left|
|- align=center
|Win
|22-5
|align=left| Mark Potter
|TKO
|3 
|2003-03-18
|align=left| 
|align=left|
|- align=center
|Win
|21-5
|align=left| Mike Holden
|TKO
|4 
|2003-01-24
|align=left| 
|align=left|
|- align=center
|Win
|20-5
|align=left| Tamas Feheri
|TKO
|2 
|2002-12-12
|align=left| 
|align=left|
|- align=center
|Win
|19-5
|align=left| Derek McCafferty
|PTS
|8
|2002-09-17
|align=left| 
|align=left|
|- align=center
|Win
|18-5
|align=left| Garing Lane
|PTS
|6
|2002-07-10
|align=left| 
|align=left|
|- align=center
|Win
|17-5
|align=left| Pele Reid
|TKO
|7 
|2002-05-09
|align=left| 
|align=left|
|- align=center
|Loss
|16-5
|align=left| Danny Williams
|RTD
|7 
|2002-02-12
|align=left| 
|align=left|
|- align=center
|Win
|16-4
|align=left| Jermell Barnes
|PTS
|8
|2001-12-20
|align=left| 
|align=left|
|- align=center
|Loss
|15-4
|align=left| Corrie Sanders
|TKO
|1 
|2001-11-03
|align=left| 
|align=left|
|- align=center
|Loss
|15-3
|align=left| Timo Hoffmann
|UD
|8
|2001-03-24
|align=left| 
|align=left|
|- align=center
|Win
|15-2
|align=left| Timo Hoffmann
|PTS
|8
|2001-02-17
|align=left| 
|align=left|
|- align=center
|Loss
|14-2
|align=left| Wayne Llewellyn
|TKO
|3 
|2000-10-14
|align=left| 
|align=left|
|- align=center
|Win
|14-1
|align=left| Tony Booth
|PTS
|6
|2000-01-18
|align=left| 
|align=left|
|- align=center
|Win
|13-1
|align=left| Chris Woollas
|RTD
|4 
|1999-07-10
|align=left| 
|align=left|
|- align=center
|Win
|12-1
|align=left| Gary Williams
|PTS
|6
|1999-01-16
|align=left| 
|align=left|
|- align=center
|Loss
|11-1
|align=left| Harry Senior
|TKO
|6 
|1998-09-12
|align=left| 
|align=left|
|- align=center
|Win
|11-0
|align=left| Michael Murray
|PTS
|6
|1998-02-14
|align=left| 
|align=left|
|- align=center
|Win
|10-0
|align=left| Ray Kane
|RTD
|1 
|1998-03-14
|align=left| 
|align=left|
|- align=center
|Win
|9-0
|align=left| Johnny Davison
|TKO
|2 
|1998-01-10
|align=left| 
|align=left|
|- align=center
|Win
|8-0
|align=left| Nick Howard
|TKO
|1 
|1997-12-06
|align=left| 
|align=left|
|- align=center
|Win
|7-0
|align=left| Darren Fearn
|PTS
|6 
|1997-11-08
|align=left| 
|align=left|
|- align=center
|Win
|6-0
|align=left| Gary Williams
|PTS
|6 
|1997-09-02
|align=left| 
|align=left|
|- align=center
|Win
|5-0
|align=left| Wladek Framas
|PTS
|6 
|1997-05-20
|align=left| 
|align=left|
|- align=center
|Win
|4-0
|align=left| Tim Redman
|KO
|2 
|1997-04-16
|align=left| 
|align=left|
|- align=center
|Win
|3-0
|align=left| Alvin Miller
|KO
|1 
|1997-03-17
|align=left| 
|align=left|
|- align=center
|Win
|2-0
|align=left| Johnny Davison
|KO
|2 
|1997-02-19
|align=left| 
|align=left|
|- align=center
|Win
|1-0
|align=left| Geoff Hunter
|TKO
|1 
|1996-11-20
|align=left| 
|align=left|

References

External links
 
Danny Williams-Michael Sprott II
In pictures: Audley Harrison vs Michael Sprott

English male boxers
Sportspeople from Reading, Berkshire
1975 births
Heavyweight boxers
Living people
Prizefighter contestants
British Boxing Board of Control champions
Commonwealth Boxing Council champions